The Transformation of Mike is a 1912 American short silent drama film directed by D. W. Griffith and starring Blanche Sweet.

Cast
 Wilfred Lucas as Mike
 Blanche Sweet as The Tenement Girl
 Edna Foster as The Tenement Girl's Brother
 William J. Butler as The Tenement Father
 Kate Bruce as A Neighbor
 W. Christy Cabanne as In Bar
 John T. Dillon as A Policeman / At Dance
 Frank Evans as A Policeman
 Robert Harron as At Dance
 Grace Henderson as At Dance
 J. Jiquel Lanoe as In Bar / At Dance
 Joseph McDermott as In Bar / At Dance
 Gus Pixley as At Dance
 W. C. Robinson as In Bar / At Dance

See also
 D. W. Griffith filmography
 Blanche Sweet filmography

References

External links

1912 films
1912 drama films
1912 short films
American silent short films
American black-and-white films
Films directed by D. W. Griffith
Biograph Company films
Silent American drama films
1910s American films